

Events

Births

June births
 June 15 – William Butler Ogden, president of the Chicago and North Western Railway (d. 1877).

August births 
 August 9 – Joseph Locke, English civil engineer who became Chief Engineer on the Grand Junction Railway (d. 1860).

November births 
 November 7 – Thomas Brassey, English railway contractor who supervised the construction of more than 6500 miles ( km) of track around the world (d. 1870).

Unknown date births
 George S. Griggs, pioneering master mechanic in American steam locomotive manufacturing (d. 1870).
 William Swinburne, American locomotive designer and builder (d. 1883).

Deaths

References